is a Japanese Teens' love (TL) manga written and illustrated by Reon Maomi.

Plot 
At a class reunion, college student Mio Fukatani has met her highschool classmate Takahide Kujō again since the past few years. She discovers that her first love is now bald and has taken over his family's temple as a priest. Even though she thought that her first love has no interest in romantic relationship due to his religious background, a passionate night ignites between the two of them.

Characters 

Mio is the protagonist and a 4th year college student who has been in love with Takahide ever since high school.

Takahide is a priest with strong sadistic tendencies, but romantically awkward.

Yukitaka is Takahide's younger brother who attends the same school as Mio. Not wanting to get himself involved in his family's traditions, he left home to live his own life the way he wants; he is later revealed to have feelings for Mio, much to his older brother's jealousy. 

Kiyotaka is the temple's priest. He is also Shiori's husband and the father of Takahide and Yukitaka.

Shiori is Kiyotaka's loving beautiful wife and the mother of Takahide and Yukitaka. She is fully supportive of her children's decisions no matter what they are.

Media

Manga 
The manga is digitally serialized at W Comics ZR's Jun'ai Kakumei G! in 2014 via W Comics. The first volume was released in June 2015. The third volume was released by publisher Seiunsha's Clair TL Comics in June 2016, and W Comics ZR released the 10th volume.

Volumes

Anime 
It was announced on March 2017 that it would have the anime adaptation. The anime is directed by Hideki Araki at studio Seven, with series composition by Makoto Takada. Mizuki Aoba adapts Reon Maomi's art into animation and Hisayoshi Hirasawa is the sound director. The anime is broadcast on Tokyo MX with 12 episodes, each in 3–5 minutes. Confetti Smile sungs the opening theme titled "Meaning of Life". The anime has 3 versions: general version for regular TV audiences, an R15 version that is broadcast in AT-X, and an R18 version that can be digitally rented via ComicFesta Anime Zone.

Episode list

Notes

References

External links 
 Official anime website 
 

2017 anime television series debuts
Anime series based on manga
Buddhist comics
Josei manga
Seven (animation studio)